Halang may refer to:

 Halang, Calamba, a barangay in Laguna, Philippines
 Halang, Ukhrul, a village in Manipur, India
 Halang Island, in Rokan Hilir, Riau, Indonesia
 Halang language, a language spoken in Vietnam and Laos
 Halang, a barangay in the municipality of Taal, Batangas, Philippines
 Halang, a subtribe and linguistic variety of the Tangsa language spoken in North East India